Markus Beyer (28 April 1971 – 3 December 2018) was a German professional boxer who won the World Boxing Council super middleweight title. As an amateur, he represented Germany at the 1992 and 1996 Olympic Games in the light middleweight division. He also won a bronze medal at the 1995 World Amateur Boxing Championships and silver at the 1996 European Amateur Boxing Championships.

Amateur career
Beyer's amateur record was 235 wins in 274 fights.
 1988 East German Featherweight Champion, won the Junior European Flyweight Championship in Gdansk, Poland beating Zoltan Lunka (Romania) in the final.
 1989 2nd place at the Junior World Championship in Bayamon, Puerto Rico as a Featherweight
 1992 competed at the Barcelona Olympics as a Light Middleweight. Results were:
 Defeated Sililo Figota (New Zealand) PTS (16–2)
 Lost to Juan Carlos Lemus (Cuba) RSCH-1
 1993 German Light Middleweight Champion, competed at the World Championship in Tampere, Finland
 1994 2nd place at German Championship, losing the final to Mario Veit
 1995 German Light Middleweight Champion, 3rd place at World Championship in Berlin, Germany
 1996 2nd Place at European Championship in Vejle (Denmark) losing the final to Francisc Vastag (Romania), competed at the Atlanta Olympics. Results were:
 Defeated Francisc Vastag (Romania) PTS (17–12)
 Defeated Gyorgy Mizsei (Hungary) PTS (14–3)
 Lost to Yermakhan Ibraimov (Kazakhstan) PTS (9–19)

Professional career
On 23 October 1999, Beyer won his first world title against WBC super middleweight champion Richie Woodhall. He successfully defended the title against Leif Keiski before losing it to Glenn Catley.

On 5 April 2003, Beyer challenged Canadian WBC super middleweight champion Eric Lucas and was awarded a highly controversial split decision in Germany. It was later proven that Beyer's team cheated by obtaining the judges' scores during the fight. Beyer defended the title against Danny Green and Andre Thysse before being upset by Cristian Sanavia. Beyer defeated Sanavia by knockout in a rematch then went on to retain the title five times by scoring wins over Yoshinori Nishizawa, Danny Green, Omar Sheika, Alberto Colajanni, and a draw against Sakio Bika.

On 14 October 2006, Beyer lost his title via third-round knockout to WBA super middleweight champion Mikkel Kessler in a unification fight.

Titles held
 German super middleweight;
 IBF Intercontinental super middleweight;
 3 times WBC super middleweight 23 October 1999 to 6 May 2000; 5 April 2003 to 5 June 2004; 9 October 2004 to 14 October 2006
 WBC International super middleweight; 21 April 2001 to 24 August 2002

Professional boxing record

Personal life
In 2008, Beyer married Daniela Haak, aka Lady Danii from the Mr. President Eurodance band. 

Beyer died 3 December 2018 of a short and serious illness.

See also
List of world super-middleweight boxing champions

References

External links

Homepage von Markus Beyer

 

1971 births
2018 deaths
German male boxers
Southpaw boxers
Boxers at the 1992 Summer Olympics
Boxers at the 1996 Summer Olympics
Olympic boxers of Germany
AIBA World Boxing Championships medalists
Super-middleweight boxers
World super-middleweight boxing champions
World Boxing Council champions